The Preston Episodes is an American sitcom that aired from September 9, 1995, to October 28, 1995, on Fox.

Premise
A divorced English professor recently moved from New Jersey starts working as a caption writer for a gossip magazine called Stuff in Manhattan.

Cast
David Alan Grier as David Preston
Judith Scott as Kelly Freeman
Tommy Hinkley as Derek Clooney
Matthew Walker as Adam Green
Brent Hinkley as Harlow
Clive Revill as Larry Dunhill

Episodes

References

External links

1995 American television series debuts
1995 American television series endings
1990s American black sitcoms
1990s American sitcoms
English-language television shows
Fox Broadcasting Company original programming
Television shows set in New York City